Paul Edward Miller (born August 21, 1959) is an American former professional ice hockey forward who played three games in the National Hockey League for the Colorado Rockies. He was a member of the 1978 NCAA Champion Boston University Hockey Team. He is the younger brother of Bob Miller (ice hockey).

Career statistics

Regular season and playoffs

International

External links
 

1959 births
Living people
American men's ice hockey centers
Boston University Terriers men's ice hockey players
Colorado Rockies (NHL) players
Flint Generals players
Fort Worth Texans players
Ice hockey players from Massachusetts
Milwaukee Admirals (IHL) players
Moncton Alpines (AHL) players
Muskegon Mohawks players
NCAA men's ice hockey national champions
People from Billerica, Massachusetts
Richmond Rifles players
Sportspeople from Middlesex County, Massachusetts
Syracuse Hornets players
Undrafted National Hockey League players
Wichita Wind players